is an English land law and English trusts law case, concerning a constructive trust of land (a home) which will often be irrevocable whilst the occupier is in occupation as opposed to a licence to occupy — and/or a tenancy at will which is similar save that without transfer of the underlying property it can be revoked without cause. The case hinged on the fact there was an agreement specifying the existing occupier was to remain.

Bannister v Bannister (1948) 2 All ER 133 was followed and approved.

Facts
Mr and Mrs Binions promised the sellers to allow Mrs Evans to remain in her cottage for life when they bought it. Mrs Evans's relationship pre-dated the Binions' interest in the property (the Tredegar Estate had allowed her and her husband before he died, a servant of theirs to occupy and had entered into its standard tenancy with her as the survivor). The Binions family argued she was a ‘tenant at will’.

Judgment
Lord Denning MR held that Mrs Evans could assert her right to remain in the cottage against the Binions even though she had no legal or equitable property right as such.

A contractual licence is itself an equitable interest in land.

Megaw LJ held that Mrs Evans had rather an equitable life interest, more than a contractual licence. He noted the possibility of a tort being commissioned if someone knowingly acquires a right with the intention of not allowing someone to exercise their contractual right. ‘However, it may be that there are special technical considerations in the law relating to land that would require to be reviewed before one could confidently assert that the ordinary principles as to the protection of known contractual rights would apply.’

Stephenson LJ agreed with the other judges, including the judge below and gave his own judgment:

See also

English trusts law
English land law
English property law

References

English land case law
Court of Appeal (England and Wales) cases
1972 in case law
1972 in British law